Gavin Swan (born 30 October 1970) is an Australian cricketer. He played eleven first-class matches for Western Australia between 1999/00 and 2001/02.

References

External links
 

1970 births
Living people
Australian cricketers
Western Australia cricketers
Cricketers from Perth, Western Australia